The 1980–81 NBA season was the 76ers 32nd season in the NBA and 18th season in Philadelphia The team finished the regular season with a 62-20 record, however they lost the tie breaker with the Boston Celtics who had the home court advantage with the same regular season record. In the playoffs, they lost a seven-game series to the Boston Celtics, in the Eastern Conference Finals, after having a three games to one series lead. This was the second time this occurred between the two teams (other in 1968), and the final 3 games of the series were decided by 5 points total. Julius Erving would win the Most Valuable Player of the League.

Draft picks

Roster

Regular season

Season standings

z - clinched division title
y - clinched division title
x - clinched playoff spot

Record vs. opponents

Game log

Regular season

|- align="center" bgcolor="#ffcccc"
| 1
|- align="center" bgcolor="#ccffcc"
| 2
|- align="center" bgcolor="#ffcccc"
| 3
|- align="center" bgcolor="#ccffcc"
| 4
|- align="center" bgcolor="#ccffcc"
| 5
|- align="center" bgcolor="#ccffcc"
| 6
|- align="center" bgcolor="#ccffcc"
| 7
|- align="center" bgcolor="#ccffcc"
| 8
|- align="center" bgcolor="#ccffcc"
| 9
|- align="center" bgcolor="#ccffcc"
| 10

|- align="center" bgcolor="#ccffcc"
| 11
|- align="center" bgcolor="#ccffcc"
| 12
|- align="center" bgcolor="#ccffcc"
| 13
|- align="center" bgcolor="#ccffcc"
| 14
|- align="center" bgcolor="#ccffcc"
| 15
|- align="center" bgcolor="#ffcccc"
| 16
|- align="center" bgcolor="#ccffcc"
| 17
|- align="center" bgcolor="#ccffcc"
| 18
|- align="center" bgcolor="#ccffcc"
| 19
|- align="center" bgcolor="#ccffcc"
| 20
|- align="center" bgcolor="#ccffcc"
| 21
|- align="center" bgcolor="#ccffcc"
| 22
|- align="center" bgcolor="#ccffcc"
| 23
|- align="center" bgcolor="#ccffcc"
| 24
|- align="center" bgcolor="#ccffcc"
| 25
|- align="center" bgcolor="#ccffcc"
| 26

|- align="center" bgcolor="#ffcccc"
| 27
|- align="center" bgcolor="#ccffcc"
| 28
|- align="center" bgcolor="#ccffcc"
| 29
|- align="center" bgcolor="#ccffcc"
| 30
|- align="center" bgcolor="#ccffcc"
| 31
|- align="center" bgcolor="#ccffcc"
| 32
|- align="center" bgcolor="#ccffcc"
| 33
|- align="center" bgcolor="#ccffcc"
| 34
|- align="center" bgcolor="#ccffcc"
| 35
|- align="center" bgcolor="#ccffcc"
| 36
|- align="center" bgcolor="#ccffcc"
| 37
|- align="center" bgcolor="#ffcccc"
| 38
|- align="center" bgcolor="#ffcccc"
| 39
|- align="center" bgcolor="#ffcccc"
| 40

|- align="center" bgcolor="#ccffcc"
| 41
|- align="center" bgcolor="#ccffcc"
| 42
|- align="center" bgcolor="#ccffcc"
| 43
|- align="center" bgcolor="#ccffcc"
| 44
|- align="center" bgcolor="#ccffcc"
| 45
|- align="center" bgcolor="#ccffcc"
| 46
|- align="center" bgcolor="#ffcccc"
| 47
|- align="center" bgcolor="#ccffcc"
| 48
|- align="center" bgcolor="#ccffcc"
| 49
|- align="center" bgcolor="#ffcccc"
| 50
|- align="center" bgcolor="#ccffcc"
| 51
|- align="center" bgcolor="#ccffcc"
| 52
|- align="center" bgcolor="#ccffcc"
| 53
|- align="center" bgcolor="#ffcccc"
| 54

|- align="center" bgcolor="#ccffcc"
| 55
|- align="center" bgcolor="#ccffcc"
| 56
|- align="center" bgcolor="#ccffcc"
| 57
|- align="center" bgcolor="#ccffcc"
| 58
|- align="center" bgcolor="#ccffcc"
| 59
|- align="center" bgcolor="#ffcccc"
| 60
|- align="center" bgcolor="#ccffcc"
| 61
|- align="center" bgcolor="#ccffcc"
| 62
|- align="center" bgcolor="#ffcccc"
| 63
|- align="center" bgcolor="#ccffcc"
| 64
|- align="center" bgcolor="#ffcccc"
| 65
|- align="center" bgcolor="#ccffcc"
| 66
|- align="center" bgcolor="#ccffcc"
| 67

|- align="center" bgcolor="#ffcccc"
| 68
|- align="center" bgcolor="#ffcccc"
| 69
|- align="center" bgcolor="#ccffcc"
| 70
|- align="center" bgcolor="#ccffcc"
| 71
|- align="center" bgcolor="#ccffcc"
| 72
|- align="center" bgcolor="#ccffcc"
| 73
|- align="center" bgcolor="#ffcccc"
| 74
|- align="center" bgcolor="#ffcccc"
| 75
|- align="center" bgcolor="#ffcccc"
| 76
|- align="center" bgcolor="#ccffcc"
| 77
|- align="center" bgcolor="#ffcccc"
| 78
|- align="center" bgcolor="#ccffcc"
| 79
|- align="center" bgcolor="#ccffcc"
| 80
|- align="center" bgcolor="#ccffcc"
| 81
|- align="center" bgcolor="#ffcccc"
| 82

Playoffs

|- align="center" bgcolor="#ccffcc"
| 1
| March 31
| Indiana
| W 124–108
| Julius Erving (32)
| Caldwell Jones (12)
| Andrew Toney (11)
| Spectrum7,288
| 1–0
|- align="center" bgcolor="#ccffcc"
| 2
| April 2
| @ Indiana
| W 96–85
| Julius Erving (23)
| Caldwell Jones (11)
| Maurice Cheeks (6)
| Market Square Arena8,921
| 2–0
|-

|- align="center" bgcolor="#ccffcc"
| 1
| April 5
| Milwaukee
| W 125–122
| Julius Erving 38)
| Caldwell Jones 11)
| Caldwell Jones 7)
| Spectrum9,727
| 1–0
|- align="center" bgcolor="#ffcccc"
| 2
| April 7
| Milwaukee
| L 99–109
| Bobby Jones (22)
| Julius Erving (13)
| Maurice Cheeks (6)
| Spectrum15,259
| 1–1
|- align="center" bgcolor="#ccffcc"
| 3
| April 10
| @ Milwaukee
| W 108–103
| Erving, Dawkins (23)
| Caldwell Jones (13)
| Maurice Cheeks (9)
| MECCA Arena11,052
| 2–1
|- align="center" bgcolor="#ffcccc"
| 4
| April 12
| @ Milwaukee
| L 98–109
| Julius Erving (22)
| Caldwell Jones (8)
| Maurice Cheeks (8)
| MECCA Arena11,052
| 2–2
|- align="center" bgcolor="#ccffcc"
| 5
| April 15
| Milwaukee
| W 116–99
| Cheeks, Hollins (20)
| Julius Erving (9)
| Maurice Cheeks (10)
| Spectrum15,384
| 3–2
|- align="center" bgcolor="#ffcccc"
| 6
| April 17
| @ Milwaukee
| L 86–109
| Julius Erving (25)
| Julius Erving (7)
| Maurice Cheeks (7)
| MECCA Arena11,052
| 3–3
|- align="center" bgcolor="#ccffcc"
| 7
| April 19
| Milwaukee
| W 99–98
| Julius Erving (28)
| Caldwell Jones (12)
| Maurice Cheeks (11)
| Spectrum6,704
| 4–3
|-

|- align="center" bgcolor="#ccffcc"
| 1
| April 21
| @ Boston
| W 105–104
| Andrew Toney (26)
| Julius Erving (9)
| Maurice Cheeks (8)
| Boston Garden15,320
| 1–0
|- align="center" bgcolor="#ffcccc"
| 2
| April 22
| @ Boston
| L 118–99
| Andrew Toney (35)
| Dawkins, Toney (7)
| Andrew Toney (7)
| Boston Garden15,320
| 1–1
|- align="center" bgcolor="#ccffcc"
| 3
| April 24
| Boston
| W 110–100
| Julius Erving (22)
| Caldwell Jones (14)
| Maurice Cheeks (8)
| Spectrum18,276
| 2–1
|- align="center" bgcolor="#ccffcc"
| 4
| April 26
| Boston
| W 107–105
| Julius Erving (20)
| Caldwell Jones (10)
| Maurice Cheeks (10)
| Spectrum18,276
| 3–1
|- align="center" bgcolor="#ffcccc"
| 5
| April 29
| @ Boston
| L 109–111
| Lionel Hollins (23)
| Darryl Dawkins (8)
| Erving, Hollins (5)
| Boston Garden15,320
| 3–2
|- align="center" bgcolor="#ffcccc"
| 6
| May 1
| Boston
| L 98–100
| Darryl Dawkins (24)
| Caldwell Jones (8)
| Maurice Cheeks (8)
| Spectrum18,276
| 3–3
|- align="center" bgcolor="#ffcccc"
| 7
| May 3
| @ Boston
| L 90–91
| Julius Erving (23)
| Caldwell Jones (15)
| Maurice Cheeks (7)
| Boston Garden15,320
| 3–4
|-

Player statistics

Playoffs

Awards and records
Julius Erving, NBA Most Valuable Player Award
Julius Erving, All-NBA First Team
Bobby Jones, NBA All-Defensive First Team
Caldwell Jones, NBA All-Defensive First Team

See also
1980-81 NBA season

References

Philadelphia 76ers seasons
Ph
Philadelphia
Philadelphia